Tha Funk Capital of the World is the thirteenth studio album by American funk musician Bootsy Collins, released on April 26, 2011, by Mascot Records. It features an array of Bootsy's friends and colleagues including Chuck D, Snoop Dogg and Bootsy's one time Parliament and P-Funk bandmates, George Clinton and Bernie Worrell. The album has one single: "Don't Take My Funk", featuring Catfish Collins and Bobby Womack.

Critical reception
The album has been generally well received. Metacritic reported an overall rating of 68, with six "positive" and five "mixed" reviews. Daniel Ross of the BBC said the album was "waking up a new generation to funk’s heritage", though he said that all the cameos made the album feel "sluggish and bloated at times". Betty Clarke of The Guardian gave the album 4/5 stars, reporting that the album was "as close to the Mothership as it gets".

Track listing
By AllMusic and Music Thread.

Notes
 Bootsy announced a world tour starting on May 3, 2011 on the back of the album, encompassing the United States, Canada, the Netherlands, and Switzerland.
 A limited edition copy of the album was released with an "eye-popping" 3-D holographic cover, making the album seem "alive", according to Bootsy.

References

External links
 Bootsy Collins' Official Site

2011 albums
Bootsy Collins albums
Mascot Records albums